Constante Gomes Sodré was the third president (governor) of the Brazilian state of Espírito Santo.  He was appointed for the function by the President of Brazil, Marshall Manuel Deodoro da Fonseca, and governed the state from September 9, 1890 to November 20, 1890.

He was elected vice-president (vice-governor) of the state in 1896, and due to the resignation of the governor Graciano dos Santos Neves on September 23, 1897, Sodré occupied again the office as governor from until January 6, 1898, when a new governor, José Marcelino Pessoa de Vasconcellos, elected by the people to finish the 1896–1900 term, took the charge.

References

Governors of Espírito Santo
Year of death missing
Year of birth missing